Gorge Wildlife Park is a privately-owned sanctuary in the Australian state of South Australia. It is at Cudlee Creek in the Adelaide Hills and continues to be operated by the same family that established it in 1965. It is 30 km northeast of Adelaide. Situated on 14 acres of land, under shaded trees, paths meander among the largest privately owned collection of Australian animals. The park provides contact with a range of Australian native animals as well as exhibits of Australian and exotic animals and birds. A feature is the opportunity for visitors to hold a koala.

Gorge Wildlife Park is involved in protection and preservation of some endangered species such as the brush-tailed rock-wallaby (petrogale penicillata).

List of species 

Birds

Australian boobook owl
Australian pelican
Australian white ibis
Black swan
Blue peafowl
Blue-and-gold macaw
Blue-winged kookaburra
Brolga
Budgerigar
Cattle egret
Common ostrich
Dusky moorhen
Emu
Galah
Gang-gang cockatoo
Golden-shouldered parrot
Green dove
Green catbird
Green-winged macaw
Jabiru
Lady Amherst's pheasant
Laughing kookaburra
Little penguin
Luzon bleeding-heart
Magpie goose
Nankeen kestrel
Nicobar pigeon
Pacific black duck
Princess parrot
Radjah shelduck
Rainbow lorikeet
Red-tailed black cockatoo
Scarlet-chested parrot
Southern cassowary
Star finch
Sun conure
Superb fairywren
Turquoise parrot
Wedge-tailed eagle
Whistling kite
White-bellied sea eagle
White-headed pigeon
White-tailed black cockatoo
Yellow-tailed black cockatoo
(many others, Gorge has over 150 bird species)

Mammals

Arabian camel
Bare-nosed wombat
Black-handed spider monkey
Bolivian squirrel monkey
Brazilian agouti
Brush-tailed rock wallaby
Capybara
Cotton-top tamarin
Dingo
Domestic goat
Emperor tamarin
European fallow deer
Ghost bat
Golden lion tamarin
Greater bilby
Grey-headed flying fox
Japanese macaque
Koala
Lar gibbon
Meerkat
Oriental small-clawed otter
Parma wallaby
Patagonian mara
Quokka
Red kangaroo (including albino)
Red-necked wallaby
Ring-tailed lemur
Serval
Short-beaked echidna
South American coati
Southern hairy-nosed wombat
Spinifex hopping mouse
Squirrel glider
Swamp wallaby
Tammar wallaby
Tasmanian Devil
Varied white-fronted capuchin
Western grey kangaroo (including Kangaroo Island subspecies)
White-tufted marmoset

Reptiles

Aldabra giant tortoise
American alligator
Blood python
Boa constrictor
Bobtail lizard
Carolina box turtle
Carpet python
Central bearded dragon
Corn snake
Eastern water dragon
Fiji crested iguana
Gila monster
Green iguana
Hermann's tortoise
Lace monitor
Leopard tortoise
Murray short-necked turtle
Red-eared slider turtle
Western blue-tongued lizard

References

1965 establishments in Australia
Zoos established in 1965
Zoos in South Australia
Animal sanctuaries
Wildlife parks in Australia